Peronochaeta is a genus of annelid known from the Middle Cambrian Burgess Shale. 19 specimens of Peronochaeta are known from the Greater Phyllopod bed, where they comprise < 0.1% of the community. The genus was described by Conway Morris (1979) and re-examined by Eibye-Jacobsen (2004).

References

External links 
 

Burgess Shale fossils
Prehistoric annelid genera

Cambrian genus extinctions